Tower Research Capital LLC, or simply Tower Research, is a high-frequency trading, algorithmic trading, and financial services fund.

About Tower 

Tower Research Capital is one of the oldest automated trading firms. It was started by Mark Gorton and Alistair Brown in February 1998.

Tower's internal trading teams are independent from one another, enjoying autonomy while accessing shared technology resources such as hardware, software, and connectivity as well as resources such as business management, legal, compliance, and risk management.

At the heart of operations is the core engineering team, which owns the architecture, implementation and optimization of the trading platform itself. This includes developing systems and tools to access market data, perform trend analysis, run trading simulations, order entry and management, real-time trade support, risk management and post-trade services.

Working together, Tower builds technology and deploys diverse automated and quantitative strategies across a broad range of asset classes in global markets around the clock.

Tower is staffed by employees proficient in diverse backgrounds such as mathematics, computer programming, physics, law, economics, engineering, finance, and more. As of 2022, Tower has over 1,000 employees in its global staff.

Albert An serves as the CEO of the firm from 2019.

Legal issues 
In 2014 Tower Research's wholly-owned subsidiary Latour Trading, which sometimes accounted for 9% of U.S. stock trading, was fined a record $16 million for violating the net capital rule. Latour deliberately mis-estimated its exposure to risk and traded despite not holding enough capital. 

In 2019 Tower Research was fined $67.4 million for manipulating the markets in E-mini financial futures contracts by spoofing. Tower traders placed thousands of orders for futures contracts that it never intended to execute. Three traders were criminally charged and two pled guilty in the case. Tower subsequently settled a class-action lawsuit for $15 million.

In 2021 a suit alleging spoofing by Tower Research brought by Korean investors was decided in favor of Tower when the court ruled that trading on the Korean exchange was not subject to the U.S. Commodity Exchange Act.

Locations 
Tower is headquartered in New York, with additional offices in Chicago, South Charleston, Montreal, London, Amsterdam, Gurgaon, GIFT City, Singapore, Hong Kong, and Shanghai.

References

External links

Financial services companies of the United States
Financial services companies established in 1998